Kevin Kuhn (born 18 February 1998) is a Swiss multi-discipline cyclist, who competes in cyclo-cross for UCI Cyclo-cross Team Tormans, and in road cycling for UCI Continental team . He won the silver medal in the men's under-23 event at the 2020 UCI Cyclo-cross World Championships in Dübendorf.

Major results

Cyclo-cross

2014–2015
 2nd National Junior Championships
2015–2016
 1st  National Junior Championships
2016–2017
 3rd National Under-23 Championships
2017–2018
 3rd National Under-23 Championships
2018–2019
 2nd National Under-23 Championships
2019–2020
 1st  National Under-23 Championships
 1st  Overall UCI Under-23 World Cup
1st Bern
1st Namur
1st Heusden-Zolder
2nd Tábor
2nd Nommay
 2nd  UCI World Under-23 Championships
 3rd Madiswil
2020–2021
 1st  National Championships
 1st Overall EKZ CrossTour
1st Hittnau
3rd Baden
 1st Steinmaur
2021–2022
 1st  National Championships
 1st Illnau
2022–2023
 Swiss Cup
1st Mettmenstetten
1st Meilen
 1st Illnau
 1st Steinmaur
 UCI World Cup
3rd Val di Sole

References

External links

Kevin Kuhn at Cyclocross 24

1998 births
Living people
Cyclo-cross cyclists
Swiss male cyclists